Tmesisternus brassi is a species of beetle in the family Cerambycidae. It was described by Gressitt in 1984.

Subspecies
 Tmesisternus brassi koresi Gressitt, 1984
 Tmesisternus brassi brassi Gressitt, 1984

References

brassi
Beetles described in 1984